In the sport of Australian rules football, the half-forward line refers to a position on the field of play.

3 players are positioned in the half-forward line, a left and right half-forward flank player, as well as a centre half-forward.

A half-forward flanker can be a forward such as John Barker, or it can be a midfielder such as Andrew McLeod, or Daniel Kerr.

The centre half-forward is probably the most athletic player on the ground. He is required to kick goals, take strong marks, and do a lot of running. It is probably the most challenging position on the field, partly the reason key position players are so sought-after. Examples of centre half-forwards include Wayne Carey, Jonathan Brown, Warren Tredrea, Nick Riewoldt, Matthew Pavlich, Anthony Rocca, Barry Hall and Scott Lucas. The most prolific CHF in the competition over the past 4 years and currently is Lance Franklin.

Australian rules football terminology